thumb|Mercedes Deambrosis in 2016.

Mercedes Deambrosis (born 1 October 1955 Madrid) is a Spanish writer who writes in French; she arrived in France at the age of 12. Many of her novels are set in Spain.

Works 
 2001: Un après-midi avec Rock Hudson  
 2002: Suite et Fin au Grand Condé (Buchet/Chastel)  
 2004:  La Promenade des délices (Buchet/Chastel)  
 2005:  Milagrosa (Buchet-/hastel)   
 2006:  La Plieuse de parachutes (Buchet/Chastel)  
 2008: Candelaria ne viendra pas  
 2009: Juste pour le Plaisir (Buchet/Chastel)  
 2009: Rien de bien grave (Éditions du Chemin de fer)  
 2010: De naissance (Editions du Moteur) (reprint in 2011 in Six façons de le dire, collective work (with Nicolas d'Estienne d'Orves, Sophie Adriansen, Yasmina Khadra, David Foenkinos), Editions du Moteur)
 2013: Le Dernier des treize (Éditions Labranche)  
 2014: L'Étrange Apparition de Tecla Osorio (Éditions des Busclats)

External links 
 Mercedes Deambrosis on M-E-L
 Mercedes Deambrosis on Editions du Chemin de Fer
 Mercedes Deambrosis on Iggy Book
 Mercedes Deambrosis on Librairie PACA.com
 Le dernier des treize by Mercedes Deambrosis on 20 minutes (France)

1955 births
Living people
21st-century Spanish writers
Writers from Madrid
Spanish writers in French
21st-century Spanish women writers